The 2010 A Championship Cup was a one-off cup competition featuring teams that played in the 2010 A Championship. It was also referred to as the Newstalk Cup for sponsorship reasons.  It was won by Sporting Fingal A, who defeated Bohemians A in the final.

Procedure
There were eighteen participating clubs in the 2010 Newstalk Cup; they were divided into four groups - five teams in Pool 2 and Pool 3 and four teams in Pool 1 and Pool 4. All the teams played each other once and the group winners then advanced to the semi-finals.

Teams received three points for a win and one point for a draw. No points were awarded for a loss. Teams were ranked by total points, then goal difference and then goals scored.

Season

Pool 1

Pool 2

Pool 3

Pool 4

Semi-finals

Fixtures were played on 8 May and 2 June 2010.

Final

See also
 2010 A Championship

References

External links
 League of Ireland

A Cha
cup
Defunct association football cup competitions in the Republic of Ireland